Rudolph Rinchere (born January 10, 1978), better known by his stage name Bang Belushi (previously Shim-E-Bango), is an American underground rapper from Detroit, Michigan. He is a current member of the Fat Killahz and also Obie Trice's hypeman.

Bango studied at Oak Park High School, Oak Park, Michigan.

Due to the Fat Killahz hiatus, Bango collaborated with producer Chanes to release his first solo extended play The Bridgecard EP in 2011 featured guest appearances by Guilty Simpson, Moe Dirdee, Invy Da Truth, F.K., and Miz Korona. In 2016, he collaborated with his fellow Fat Killahz bandmate King Gordy under Bango's new alias Bang Belushi to release Herojuana EP. In the beginning of 2017, he drops his second solo extended play Help Yourself.

It was announced via Twitter that Bango will release his debut full-length studio album The Adventures of Bang Belushi with producer Shane "Foul Mouth" Webb later following Help Yourself in 2017. However, the album was released on December 28, 2018 via Middle Finger Music.

Belushi stated Run-DMC, 2Pac, Notorious B.I.G., N.W.A. as his influence.

Discography

Studio albums
2005 - Guess Who's Coming to Dinner? (with Fatt Father, Marv Won and King Gordy, as the Fat Killahz)
2018 - The Adventures of Bang Belushi
2021 – Rudy

Extended plays
2011 - The E.P. (with Fatt Father, Marv Won and King Gordy, as the Fat Killahz)
2011 - The Bridgecard
2016 - Herojuana (with King Gordy)
2017 - help yourself.

Mixtapes
2003 - 2 Fat, 2 Furious (with Fatt Father, Marv Won and King Gordy, as the Fat Killahz)
2004 - WFKR 31.3 FKM: FK Radio the Mixtape (with Fatt Father, Marv Won and King Gordy, as the Fat Killahz)

Guest appearances
2001 - "Everybody's Trippin'" by DJ Butter, Slickonez, Dogmatic, B-Boy R.E.G., King Gordy from Shit Happens
2001 - "These Dayz" by Lab Animalz from Let the Animalz Out
2003 - "Power of the Underground" by SickNotes, 5ela, Promatic, Obie Trice, King Gordy, Supa Emcee, Paradime from The Virus & Sick Note Soldiers
2006 - "It's About to Go Down" (prod. Kon Artis) by Salam Wreck from Trouble Soon
2006 - "Only Wanna Smoke" & "Place Ya Bets" by Alius Pnukkl & King Gordy from The Unknown Filez
2009 - "Get Back" by Marv Won & Fatt Father from Way of the Won
2010 - "Amen" by Fatt Father from Fatherly Advice
2011 - "14 Emcees" by D12, 3Six, Beez, Calicoe, Chacity, Fatt Father, Kid Vishis, Mae Day, Miz Korona, Moe Dirdee, Redd Bone, Seven the General, Shakia Snow, T. Dot from Return of the Dozen Vol. 2
2015 - "The Herb" by Knox Money & Steve O from Going Over
2016 - "In the Sky" by Hundred Barz from Solace
2018 - "'93 Jerry Ball" & "Bang and the Barfly" by Aztek the Barfly from Line King

References

External links
Bang Belushi at Discogs
Shim-E-Bango at Discogs

Living people
Underground rappers
Rappers from Detroit
American male rappers
Midwest hip hop musicians
21st-century American rappers
21st-century American male musicians
1978 births